La Flèche Wallonne Féminine is a professional women's bicycle road race held each year in Wallonia, Belgium, in April. It is part of the UCI Women's World Tour, cycling's season-long competition of top-tier races, in which it is the third-oldest single-day event after the Trofeo Alfredo Binda in Italy and the Emakumeen Euskal Bira in the Basque Country. The event is raced on the same day as La Flèche Wallonne for men.

The race was inaugurated by Tour de France organizers ASO in 1998 and quickly became a road race classic. From 1999 onwards, the women's Flèche Wallonne was a UCI Women's Road Cycling World Cup event. In 2016, the race became part of the new UCI Women's World Tour.

The Flèche Wallonne Féminine is held in conjunction with the men's race, on much of the same roads but at a shorter distance. Likewise, the race always finishes on the steep Mur de Huy. Anna van der Breggen from the Netherlands holds the record for the most wins, with 7 wins, which are also in succession spanning from 2015 to 2021.

Winners

Multiple winners

Wins per country

References

Results

External links

Cycle races in Belgium
 
UCI Women's Road World Cup
Recurring sporting events established in 1998
1998 establishments in Belgium
Women's road bicycle races
UCI Women's World Tour races